Tonicella insignis, the white-lined chiton, or red chiton, also known as the hidden chiton, belongs to the Tonicellidae family in the class Polyplacophora, and the phylum of Mollusca. Its body length of T. insignis is around 5 cm.

Habitat
It can be found in the coastal region of Alaska to Oregon in North America. Similar to other types of chitons, T. insignis also lives on hard rocks in the sub-tidal zone and can be found at depths up to 52 meters under water.

Characteristic
Tonicella insignis have camouflaged eight-valve shells with white wavy lines on all valves. The shell protects themselves from predators by blending their body into the environment. The special white line on T. insignis is one of the most distinguish characteristic which only exist on the second to the seventh valve.

Tonicella insignis mainly eats phytoplankton and algae that floating around them or on the rock. The shell consists of eight valves which gives them flexibility while crawling through uneven rocks and also the ability of curling up as a ball while facing external threat.

Similar species
One closely related species with T. insignis is Tonicella lineata, which has similar color of shell but have pink or orange lines on the shell instead of white.

Reproductive cycle
The reproductive cycle of this chiton happens annually. They reproduce between summer and mid-winter demonstrated with an increase in gonads size. Some earlier observations showed that their reproductive period might be effected by the changes of external environment, such as water temperature or the abundance of food supply. The major cause of triggering T. Insignis's reproductive period was believed to be the water temperature, which is between 7 and 8 °C in spring. However, the data from 1971 showed that T. Insignis started their reproductive cycle when the temperature was still 6.3 °C.

Now the common hypothesis is relating to the spring bloom, resulting the increase number of phytoplankton and algae in the water. This hypothesis later got supported by more correlative data. Possible explanation could be that with the increased abundance of food source, T. Insignis may begin to enlarge their gonad size. With further investigation, scientists Himmelman found that instead of the phytoplankton themselves as food source, some unknown substances that were related to or secreted by the phytoplankton were the key for triggering the start of their reproductive cycle.

References

External links
 
 

Ischnochitonidae